Paralympic table tennis has been competed at every Summer Paralympic Games since they were first held in 1960. Men and women compete in singles and team events in ten different classes according to the extent of their disability.

Summary

Overall medal summary
Table of medals won by nations, updated after the 2020 Summer Paralympics.

Multi medalists
Table tennis players who have won two gold medals or five medals. Active players are in bold.

Nations

See also
 World Para Table Tennis Championships
 European Para Table Tennis Championships
 Table tennis at the Summer Olympics

References

 
Paralympics
Paralympics
Sports at the Summer Paralympics

fr:Tennis de table handisport